Higher Art of Rebellion is the second full-length studio album by the German symphonic black metal band Agathodaimon. In 2009 Metal Mind Productions reissued the album as a remastered digipak edition. The reissue is limited to numerated 2000 copies and was digitally remastered using 24-Bit process on golden disc. It also retains the 2 bonus tracks of the previously released limited edition version of the album.

Track listing 

 The 1 and 3 song titles are in Romanian, 7 is in Latin and 9 is in French, though a more correct form would be "Les Possédés".

Personnel
 Sathonys - guitars
 Frank "Akaias" Nordmann - vocals
 Christine Schulte - keyboards
 Vlad Dracul - vocals, producer
 Hyperion - guitars
 Matze - drums
 Marko Thomas - bass
 Byron - guest vocals (clean)

Additional personnel and staff
 Markus Staiger - executive producer
 Gerald Axelrod - artwork
 Mihai Coman - producer
 Axel Jusseit - band photography

External links
Higher Art of Rebellion at allmusic

Agathodaimon (band) albums
Nuclear Blast albums
1999 albums